Raffaele Viviani (10 January 1888 in Castellammare di Stabia, Province of Naples – 22 March 1950) was an Italian author, playwright, actor and musician. Viviani belongs to the turn-of-the-century school of realism in Italian literature, and his works touch on seamier elements of the lives of the poor in Naples of that period, such as petty crime and prostitution. Critics have termed Viviani "an autodidact realist," meaning that he acquired his skills through personal experience and not academic education.

Viviani appeared at age 4 on the stage, and by age 20 he had acquired a solid nationwide reputation as an actor and playwright. He also played in Budapest, Paris, Tripoli, and throughout South America during his career. His plays are in the "anti-Pirandello" style, less concerned with the psychology of people than with the lives they lead. Viviani's best known-work is L'ultimo scugnizzo (The Last Urchin) (1931), scugnizzo being the underclass Neapolitan street child. Viviani composed songs and incidental music for many of his earlier works. One such well-known melodrama is via Toledo di notte, (Via Toledo by Night) a 1918 work which even incorporates American cakewalk and ragtime rhythms to tell the story of the "street people" of via Toledo, the most famous street in Naples.

Selected filmography
 The Table of the Poor (1932)
 The Blue Fleet (1932)

Partial bibliography
A festa 'e Montevergine, in Rivista di Commedie, anno XIII, n. 50, fasc. I, pp. 5–14, March 1930
'O fatto 'e cronaca, Napoli, Guida, 1932
L’imbroglione onesto, in Il Dramma, anno XIII, n. 266, 15 September 1937
Mestiere di padre, in Il Dramma, anno XV, n. 318, 15 November 1939
La tavola dei poveri, in Sipario, anno IX, n. 100–101, Aug-Sept 1954, pp. 43–61
Trentaquattro commedie scelte da tutto il teatro di Raffaele Viviani, a cura L. Ridenti, introduction by E. Possenti e saggio La commedia umana di Napoli di V. Pandolfi, 2 vol., Torino ILTE, 1957
Tuledo 'e notte, 'O fatto 'e cronaca, La musica dei ciechi, in Teatro Napoletano, a cura di G.  Trevisani, Bologna, Guanda editor, 1957
La festa di Montevergine, con saggi di C. Mazza e C. Trabucco, Napoli, ESI, 1963
Circo equestre Sgueglia, a cura di E. Bellingeri, Roma, Officina Edizioni, 1978
I dieci comandamenti, presentazione di M. Martone, Napoli, Guida, 2000
Zingari, ivi, 2006
Canti di scena, a cura di P. Scialò, ivi, 2006.

A listing of Viviani's major works is also listed in 
RAFFAELE VIVIANI, I capolavori, a cura di A. Lezza, prefazione di R. De Simone, con una nota musicale di P. Scialò, Napoli, Guida editori, 1992

The complete theatrical output of Viviani is listed in
RAFFAELE VIVIANI, Teatro, voll. I-V, a cura di G. Davico Bonino, A. Lezza, P. Scialò, Napoli, Guida Editori, 1987–1991, vol. VI, a cura di A. Lezza, P. Scialò, introd. di G. Fofi, 1994

Published biographies, criticisms and essays concerning Viviani
Da Russo a Viviani, A. Palermo, in ID., Da Mastriani a Viviani. Per una storia della letteratura a Napoli fra Otto e Novecento, Napoli, Liguori Editore, 1974, pp. 98–105
Il teatro di Viviani: lingua, dialetto, gergo, A. Lezza, in Lingua e dialetto nella tradizione letteraria italiana, AA.VV., Roma, Salerno editrice, 1996, pp. 537–551
Viviani. L’autore – L’interprete – Il cantastorie urbano, A. Lezza, P. Scalò, Napoli, Colonnese Editore, 2000
Viviani, a cura di M. Andria Napoli, Pironti, 2001
Raffaele Viviani. Teatro, poesia e musica, a cura di A. Lezza, P. Scialò, Napoli, CUEN, 2002
La funzione degli spazi: da Raffaele Viviani ad Annibale Ruccello, M. Palumbo, in La civile letteratura. Studi sull’Ottocento e il Novecento offerti ad Antonio Palermo, II, Il Novecento, AA. VV., Napoli, Liguori Editore, 2002, pp. 201–211
Commedia e dramma da Scarpetta a Viviani, G. Nicastro, in Letteratura e cultura a Napoli tra Otto e Novecento, AA. VV., a cura di E. Candela, Napoli, Liguori Editore, 2003, pp. 51–65
Raffaele Viviani. La compagnia, Napoli e l'Europa, V. Venturini, Roma, Bulzoni, 2008
Fondamentale ai fini di una ricostruzione biografica dell’A. è l’autobiografia Dalla vita alle scene, Rocca San Casciano, Cappelli, 1928, poi Napoli, Guida, 1977 e 1988
(chapter of V. VIVIANI): Raffaele Viviani, in ID., Storia del teatro napoletano, Napoli, Guida Editori, 1969, pp. 807–77 (n. ed. ivi, 1992)
(monograph of G. TREVISANI): Raffaele Viviani, Rocca San Casciano, Cappelli, 1961.

References

1888 births
1950 deaths
People from Castellammare di Stabia
Italian dramatists and playwrights
Italian male actors
Italian musicians
Culture in Naples
Italian male dramatists and playwrights
20th-century Italian dramatists and playwrights
20th-century Italian male writers